Romanovskoye is a rural locality (a selo) in Karinskoye Rural Settlement, Alexandrovsky District, Vladimir Oblast, Russia. The population was 53 as of 2010. There are two streets.

Geography 
Romanovskoye is located on the Maly Kirzhach River, 21 km southeast of Alexandrov (the district's administrative centre) by road. Dubki is the nearest rural locality.

References 

Rural localities in Alexandrovsky District, Vladimir Oblast